The 2010 Norwich City Council election took place on 9 September 2010 to elect members of Norwich City Council in England. One third of seats were up for election. The elections took place later in the year than other local elections. Norwich had previously been granted permission to become a unitary authority, with local elections postponed until 2011. When the Coalition Government won the general election earlier that year, Norwich's permission to form a unitary authority was overturned. Because of this, the High Court ruled that those councillors who had stayed on beyond their four-year term were no longer constitutionally elected, and would need to seek re-election. This resulted in there being an election in every ward in September to renew the mandate for the wards.

All changes in vote share are calculated with reference to the 2006 election, the last time these seats were contested.

Election result

|-bgcolor=#F6F6F6
| colspan=2 style="text-align: right; margin-right: 1em" | Total
| style="text-align: right;" | 13
| colspan=4 style="text-align: right;" |Turnout
| style="text-align: right;" | 28.1
| style="text-align: right;" | 28,638
| style="text-align: right;" | 
|-

Changes in vote share are relative to the last time these seats were contested in 2006.

Council Composition

Prior to the election the composition of the council was:

After the election, the composition of the council was:

Ward results

Bowthorpe

Catton Grove

Crome

Easton

Lakenham

Mancroft

Mile Cross

Nelson

Sewell

Thorpe Hamlet

Town Close

University

Wensum

References 

2010 English local elections
May 2010 events in the United Kingdom
2010
2010s in Norfolk